Kullak  is a surname. Notable people with the surname include: 

Adolph Kullak (1823–1862), German pianist and music writer
Franz Kullak (1844–1913), German pianist and composer
Theodor Kullak (1818–1882), German pianist, composer, and teacher